Mesorhizobium australicum is a gram-negative bacteria from the genus of Mesorhizobium which was isolated from nodules on Biserrula pelecinus in Australia

References

External links
Type strain of Mesorhizobium australicum at BacDive -  the Bacterial Diversity Metadatabase

Phyllobacteriaceae
Bacteria described in 2009